Qasemabad (also Romanized as Qāsemābād; also known as Kasiabad, Yang-Kalekh, Yang Qal‘eh, and Yengī Qal‘eh) is a village in Qaqazan-e Sharqi Rural District, in the Central District of Takestan County, Qazvin Province, Iran. At the 2006 census, its population was 91, in 21 families.

References 

Populated places in Takestan County